There are 26 dong (neighborhoods) in Gangnam-gu.

Apgujeong 1-dong
Apgujeong 2-dong
Cheongdam 1-dong
 Cheongdam 2-dong
 Daechi 1-dong
 Daechi 2-dong
 Daechi 3-dong
 Daechi 4-dong
 Dogok 1-dong
 Dogok 2-dong
 Gaepo 1-dong
 Gaepo 2-dong
 Gaepo 3-dong
 Gaepo 4-dong

 Irwon 1-dong
 Irwon 2-dong
 Irwon bon-dong
 Nonhyeon 1-dong
 Nonhyeon 2-dong
 Samseong 1-dong
 Samseong 2-dong
 Segok-dong
 Sinsa-dong
 Suseo-dong
 Yeoksam 1-dong
 Yeoksam 2-dong

List by Population and Area

General information

See also 
 Gu of Seoul